Radio 1010 is a Uruguayan Spanish-language AM radio station that broadcasts from Montevideo.

It currently has a sports format, with partisan football broadcasts of Nacional (Pasión tricolor) and Peñarol (Fútbol a lo Peñarol), and the daily sports talk show A fondo led by Jorge da Silveira. From 2015 to 2021, Julio Ríos hosted sports talk show Las voces del fútbol at the station.

References

External links
 
 Official website
 

Radio in Uruguay
Mass media in Montevideo
Sports radio stations
Spanish-language radio stations
Radio stations established in 1935
1935 establishments in Uruguay